The 2013–14 football season in Belgium, which is the 111th season of competitive football in the country and runs from July 2013 until June 2014.

National team football

Men's national football team

The Red Devils started their season with an entertaining goalless friendly against France in the month of August.

2014 FIFA World Cup qualification

Friendlies

Promotion and relegation
Team promoted to 2013–14 Belgian Pro League
 Belgian Second Division Champions: Oostende

Teams relegated from 2012–13 Belgian Pro League
 15th Place: Beerschot

Teams promoted to 2013–14 Belgian Second Division
 Belgian Third Division A Champions: Hoogstraten
 Belgian Third Division B Champions: Virton
 Playoff winners: ASV Geel

Teams relegated from 2012-13 Belgian Second Division
 17th Place: Oudenaarde
 18th Place: Sint-Niklaas

League competitions

Belgian First Division

Belgian Second Division

Belgian Second Division Final Round

Belgian Third Division

Transfers

European Club results
Champions Anderlecht qualified directly for the group stage of the Champions League, while runners-up Zulte Waregem started in the qualifying rounds. League numbers three and four, Club Brugge and Standard Liège started in the qualifying rounds of the Europa League, together with cup winners Genk.

Other honours

European qualification for 2014–15 summary

See also
 2013–14 Belgian Pro League
 2013–14 Belgian Cup
 2013 Belgian Super Cup
 Belgian Second Division
 Belgian Third Division: divisions A and B
 Belgian Promotion: divisions A, B, C and D

References